Al-Ittihad is a major women's professional basketball club. It is a part of the Al-Ittihad Sports Club, which is based in Aleppo, Syria.

Honours
Syrian Women Basketball League 2
Winners (1): 2019

League positions
Syrian Women Basketball League
Fourth place (1): 2021
Seventh place (2): 2009 - 2019 - 2022

References

Ittihad
Sport in Aleppo
Basketball teams established in 1951
1951 establishments in Syria